John W. Carpenter Freeway is a continuous named route consisting of connected segments of the following numbered highways:
Texas State Highway 114, a portion named after John W. Carpenter in Irving, Texas.
Texas State Highway 183, a portion named after John W. Carpenter in Irving, Texas.

See also
 John W. Carpenter

Transportation in Dallas County, Texas
Transportation in Denton County, Texas
Transportation in Tarrant County, Texas
Transportation in Wise County, Texas